Euura amerinae is a species of sawfly belonging to the family Tenthredinidae (common sawflies). The larvae form galls on bay willow (Salix pentandra). It was first described by Carl Linnaeus in 1758.

Description
As the gall matures the surface becomes cracked. According to Redfern et al. (2011) the gall contains one or several larvae in indistinct chambers, while the website Plant Parasites of Europe suggests the galls have circa four cells, each with a single larva and Liston et al. (2017) state that several larvae normally inhabit the gall. E. piliserra and this species are the only European gall-inducing sawfly with several larvae in a single gall. Pupation takes place in the gall.

E. amerinae is one of three closely related species known as the Euura amerinae species subgroup. The other members of the group are E. venusta (Brischke, 1883) and E. testaceipes (Brischke, 1883).

Distribution
The insect or gall has been recorded from Europe (Czech Republic, Finland, Germany, Great Britain, Ireland, the Netherlands, Norway and Sweden) through to the northern Russian Far East.

References

Tenthredinidae
Gall-inducing insects
Hymenoptera of Asia
Hymenoptera of Europe
Sawflies described in 1758
Taxa named by Carl Linnaeus
Willow galls